Robert Allan Shivers (October 5, 1907 – January 14, 1985) was an American politician who served as the 37th governor of Texas. Shivers was a leader of the Texas Democratic Party during the turbulent 1940s and 1950s and developed the lieutenant governor's post into an extremely powerful perch in the state government.

Early life and career
Born in Lufkin, the seat of Angelina County in East Texas, Shivers was educated at the University of Texas at Austin and earned a law degree in 1933. There, he was a member of the Texas Cowboys and the Friar Society, and he served as the student body president.

In 1934, he was elected to the Texas State Senate, its youngest member ever. He served there from 1934 to 1946, except for two years' service in the US Army during World War II from which he was discharged with the rank of major.

Lieutenant governor
In 1946, he was elected as the 33rd lieutenant governor of Texas by defeating the Republican nominee, John A. Donaldson, in a landslide margin, with Shivers garnering 344,630 votes (91.54%) to Donaldson's 31,835 votes (8.46%). Shivers was re-elected in 1948 by garnering 1,050,163 votes (87.47%) to the Republican Taylor Cole's 143,887 votes (11.98%).

He is credited with developing the "ideas, practices, and techniques of leadership" that made the office the most powerful post in Texas government although the governor's powers are limited by the state constitution more than in other states.

In office, Shivers initiated the practice of appointing state senators to specific committees and setting the daily agenda. Later, the Senate passed a right-to-work law, reorganized the public school system with the Gilmer-Akin laws, appropriated funds for higher education including the Texas State University for Negroes (now Texas Southern University), and provided money for improvements of state hospitals and highways.

Governor

Electoral history 
When Governor Beauford Jester died on July 11, 1949, Shivers succeeded him, the only lieutenant governor in Texas history who has gained the governor's office by the death of his predecessor. In 1950, Shivers won election as governor in his own right by defeating Republican Ralph W. Currie. There were 355,010 votes (89.93%) for the incumbent governor, and Currie garnered 39,737 votes (10.07%)

In 1952, Shivers proved so popular that he was listed on the gubernatorial ballot as the nominee of both the Democratic and Republican parties (Democrat Shivers handily defeated Republican Shivers). Between both parties, Shivers garnered 1,844,530 votes (98.05%) to "No Preference" getting 36,672 votes (1.95%). Texas law was later changed to remove the "No Preference" option.

Shivers then set the three-term precedent by running again and winning in 1954. He garnered 569,533 votes (89.42%) to the Republican Tod R. Adams's 66,154 votes (10.39%).

Governance 
He worked closely with his appointed Secretary of State John Ben Shepperd, who won in 1952 and 1954 as state attorney general. Together, Shivers and Shepperd tried to clean up corruption in the machine province of Duval County.

In 1952, Shivers named the oil industrialist Bill Noël of Odessa to the Texas Alcoholic Beverage Commission. Noël was reappointed by the two subsequent governors.

The Shivercrats were a conservative faction of the Democratic Party in Texas in the 1950s. The faction was named for Shivers, who was criticized by liberals in the party, particularly Ralph Yarborough, for his corruption and conservatism. The term was first used derisively by party's liberals, who attacked Shivers and his allies in the party for backing Republican Dwight Eisenhower over the national party's chosen candidate, Adlai Stevenson II in 1952.

Corruption during the Shivers administration damaged his reputation and endangered his chances of re-election in 1954. Land Office Commissioner Bascom Giles was convicted of committing rampant fraud against Texas war veterans, with a disproportionate number of African-American veterans in particular, by a veterans land program under the Texas Veterans Land Board of the Texas General Land Office. Giles was the only member of the Shivers administration to go to prison, but Shivers and the state attorney general, John Ben Shepperd, as ex officio members of the Veterans Land Board, were implicated in the scandal, which occurred undee their watch.

The Shivercrats responded with a vicious negative campaign that tried to paint the party liberals as communists. Shivers also urged the Texas Legislature to pass a bill making membership in the Communist Party a death-penalty offense and described such membership as being "worse than murder." However, a less extreme version of the proposition finally passed both Houses.

In 1956, Shivers ordered Captain Jay Banks of the Texas Ranger Division to block "desegregation of Mansfield High School in Tarrant County." The Mansfield school desegregation incident was the first state action resisting enforcement of the nationwide integration of public schools ordered by the US Supreme Court in Brown v. Board of Education (1954).

Lyndon Johnson at first aligned himself with the Shivercrats, including John Connally, but after becoming President, Johnson increasingly sided with Yarborough and the liberals on policy matters. Most of the Shivercrats either left public life or became Republicans after Johnson's presidency, as the liberal-moderate faction was in firm control of the state party after 1970.

Segregation and resistance to integration 
Shivers was anti-integration and used the office of the governor to resist legally-mandated integration in Texas. After the US Supreme Court decision ending the "separate but equal" doctrine in Brown v. Board of Education (1954), Shivers on July 27, 1955 appointed a committee, the Texas Advisory Committee on Segregation in Public Schools. The charge of this committee was to "[e]xamine three major problems and present recommendations leading to their solution. The problems are: (1) The prevention of forced integration. (2) The achievement of maximum decentralization of school authority. (3) The ways in which the State government may best assist the local school districts in solving their problems." The committee members were State Senator A.M. Aiken, Jr., Earnest. E. Sanders, Mrs. Joe Fisher, J.V. Hammett, Charles Howell, Will Crews Morris, and Houston attorney, Hall E. Timanus. A legal and legislative subcommittee of the Texas Advisory Committee on Segregation in Public Schools produced a 58-page report on August 18, 1955 detailing among other ideas ways that Texas schools could resist integration and the framework for ending compulsory public school attendance for those parents who did not want their children to attend integrated schools.

The recommendations of the committee were used as justification for Shivers's state actions in resisting integration, such as the Mansfield School Desegregation Incident.

Miscellaneous 
Shivers appeared as himself in the 1955 film Lucy Gallant starring Jane Wyman and Charlton Heston.

Shivers previously held the record for longest continuous service as Texas governor at 7.5 years until June 2008, when Rick Perry surpassed Shivers's record for continuous service. (Bill Clements initially broke Shivers's total service record by serving eight years over two nonconsecutive terms; Perry later surpassed that record, as well.)  Both Shivers and Perry are the only two Texas governors to have been inaugurated four times.

Shivers disputed the Truman administration's claim on the Tidelands and disapproved of Truman's veto that would have vested tideland ownership in the states. Bucking the tradition of the "Solid South, Shivers delivered Texas in the 1952 presidential election for Dwight D. Eisenhower, only the second time that Texas had supported a Republican for president since Reconstruction (the other was 1928). The state Republican Party reciprocated by nominating Shivers for governor and so ran as the nominee of both parties. Shivers is believed to have lost popularity with some voters over his disloyalty to the Democratic Party. He also became less popular because of his opposition to Brown and his link to the Veterans' Land Board scandal.

Shivers helped enact laws raising teacher salaries and granting retirement benefits to state employees.

Later career
Shivers did not seek a fourth term in the 1956 elections. He retired from politics on January 15, 1957, and went into business.

In 1973, Democratic Governor Preston Smith appointed Shivers to the University of Texas Board of Regents. In January 1975, he was elected as chairman of the board and served for four years. He donated his Austin home, Woodlawn, the historic Pease mansion, to the university to help raise funds for its law school.

In 1980, Shivers was instrumental in securing a $5 million grant for the UT Austin Moody College of Communication, which soon established an endowed chair of journalism in his honor.

Finally, he served as a member of the University of Texas Centennial Commission, which oversaw the 100th-anniversary celebration of the university's founding in 1883.

Death 

Shivers died suddenly of a massive heart attack in Austin on January 14, 1985. He was survived by his wife, the former Marialice Shary (1910–1996), a long-time regent of Pan American University in Edinburg, Texas; three sons, a daughter; and 10 grandchildren. The Shiverses are interred at the Texas State Cemetery, in Austin.

Elections

See also

 Mansfield School Desegregation Incident
 Allan Shivers Library and Museum
 Allan Shivers' altercation with author John Patric in college

References

Bibliography
 J. William Davis, There Shall Also Be a Lieutenant Governor (1967).
 Tex. Legis. Council, Presiding Officers of the Texas Legislature: 1846–1995 81 (1995).
National Governors Association, "Texas Governor Allan Shivers".

External links

Historic photographs of Allan Shivers, hosted by the Portal to Texas History
.
 

|-

|-

|-

|-

1907 births
1985 deaths
20th-century American politicians
American segregationists
United States Army personnel of World War II
Burials at Texas State Cemetery
Democratic Party governors of Texas
Lieutenant Governors of Texas
People from Austin, Texas
People from Lufkin, Texas
Democratic Party Texas state senators
United States Army officers
Old Right (United States)
American anti-communists
Military personnel from Texas